Dogonbadan (also Romanized as Do Gonbadān, Dow Gonbadān, and Du Gunbadān; also known as Gachsaran, also Romanized as Gachsārān) is a city and the capital of Gachsaran County, Kohgiluyeh and Boyer-Ahmad Province, Iran. At the 2006 census, its population was 81,902, in 18,264 families.

Economy
Dogonbadan is an oil and gas producing city that has just started to expand and profits from its industrial capacity. The city has the largest gas reserves in Iran also has the largest recoverable oil field in Iran and third in the world.

Gallery

References

External links

Gachsaran cultural site 
Gachsaran Daily News Website

Populated places in Gachsaran County
Cities in Kohgiluyeh and Boyer-Ahmad Province